Shahrestanak (also Romanized as Shahrestānak; also known as Shahrestān) is a village in Vahnabad Rural District, in the Central District of Robat Karim County, Tehran Province, Iran. At the 2006 census, its population was 315, in 76 families.

References 

Populated places in Robat Karim County